The 2000 Batang Red Bull Energizers season was the first season of the franchise in the Philippine Basketball Association (PBA).

Expansion draft

Transactions

Occurrences
The Energizers had their first franchise victory on February 27 by scoring a 90-89 overtime win over Sta.Lucia, it was soon reversed when it was found out their rookie center, 18-year-old Kerby Raymundo had deficiency in academic credentials and ineligible to play in the pro league until next year, the PBA therefore forfeited two of their victories, including a repeat won game over Sta.Lucia on March 18 in Davao City.

Roster

Elimination round

Games won

References

Barako Bull Energy Boosters seasons